Cornerstone Schools is a system of charter schools in Detroit, Michigan, United States. It has four K-8 campuses and Cornerstone Health + Technology High School, all located in the city. They were first established in 1991.

References

External links

 Cornerstone Schools
 "Detroit: Save our schools." CNN. March 17, 2010.
 "A Dream Grows for Detroit's Cornerstone Schools." Associated Press at Ludington Daily News. Friday January 8, 1993. Page 6. Google News 4 of 16.

Schools in Detroit
1991 establishments in Michigan